The 1946 Australian Championships was a tennis tournament that took place on outdoor grass courts at the Memorial Drive, Adelaide, Australia from 19 January to 29 January. It was the 34th edition of the Australian Championships (now known as the Australian Open), the 8th held in Adelaide, and the first Grand Slam tournament of the year. It was also the first edition of the championship after a five-year hiatus due to World War II. The singles titles were won by Australians John Bromwich and Nancye Wynne Bolton.

Finals

Men's singles

 John Bromwich defeated  Dinny Pails  5–7, 6–3, 7–5, 3–6, 6–2

Women's singles

 Nancye Wynne Bolton defeated  Joyce Fitch  6–4, 6–4

Men's doubles
 John Bromwich /  Adrian Quist defeated  Max Newcombe /  Len Schwartz 6–3, 6–1, 9–7

Women's doubles
 Joyce Fitch /  Mary Bevis defeated  Nancye Wynne Bolton /  Thelma Coyne Long 9–7, 6–4

Mixed doubles
 Nancye Wynne Bolton /  Colin Long defeated  Joyce Fitch /  John Bromwich 6–0, 6–4

References

External links
 Australian Open official website

1946
1946 in Australian tennis
January 1946 sports events in Australia